The 1968 Pau Grand Prix was a Formula Two motor race held on 21 April 1968 at the Pau circuit, in Pau, Pyrénées-Atlantiques, France. The Grand Prix was won by Jackie Stewart, driving the Matra MS7. Robin Widdows finished second and Jean-Pierre Beltoise third.

Classification

Race

References

Pau Grand Prix
1968 in French motorsport